Descending Angel is a 1990 television film that aired on HBO starring George C. Scott, Diane Lane and Eric Roberts.

Plot
A recently engaged man (Roberts) comes to visit his fiancée (Lane)'s future father-in-law (Scott) and gets to know him better, when he unearths clues that the man may have been a Nazi collaborator and mass murderer.

Cast
George C. Scott as Florian Stroia
Diane Lane as Irina Stroia
Eric Roberts as Michael Rossi
Mark Margolis as Bercovici
Vyto Ruginis as Glenn
Amy Aquino as Catherine
Ken Jenkins as Sam Murray
Elsa Raven as Vera
Richard Jenkins as Debaudt
Jan Rubeš as Bishop Dancu
Philip Akin as Bookstore Clerk

External links

1990 television films
1990 films
HBO Films films
Films directed by Jeremy Kagan
Films scored by James Newton Howard